Shraga Bishgada (Hebrew: שרגא בישגדא) is an Israeli children's comedy television series broadcast on the Israeli Educational Television, starring Moni Moshonov.

Background 
Shraga writes a daily live blog about important personalities. On his blog, Shraga reviews notable public figures whom have contributed to science, art, culture, health, society and politics. However, he encounters problems and manages to solve them with the help of his neighbor Aliza and housekeeper Neta.

Characters 
 Shraga (Moni Moshonov) - the main character.
 Neta (Stav Idisis) - Shraga's clever housekeeper. With her help, Shraga learns things and solves problems.
 Aliza (Dvori Reese) - Shraga's neighbor, who frequently watches his blog.

Episodes 
Every episode is about a notable public figure. During the original release of the show, these were the people that had episodes about them:

First season 

 Leonardo da Vinci - Italian polymath      
 Archimedes - Greek mathematician
 Isaac Newton - British mathematician
 Christopher Columbus - Italian explorer
 Martha Graham - American choreographer
 Leah Goldberg - Israeli poet
 Albert Einstein - German scientist
 Salvador Dalí - Spanish artist
 Marcel Marceau - French mime
 Hans Christian Andersen - Dutch author
 Georges Méliès - French film maker
 Galileo Galilei - Italian polymath
 Avraham Shlonsky - Israeli poet
 Alfred Nobel - Swedish chemist
 Mahatma Gandhi - Indian leader
 Thomas Edison - American inventor
 Theodor Herzl - Father of modern Zionism
 William Shakespeare - English poet
 Wolfgang Amadeus Mozart - Austrian composer
 Charlie Chaplin - British actor
 David Ben-Gurion - First Israeli prime-minister
 Marcel Duchamp - French painter
 Astrid Lindgren - Swedish author
 Hayim Nahman Bialik - Hebrew poet
 René Magritte - Belgian painter
 Honoré Daumier - French painter
 Amelia Earhart - American pioneer
 Florence Nightingale - English nurse
 Martin Luther King Jr. - American activist
 Alexander Graham Bell - Scottish inventor

Second season 

 Emile Habibi - Arab writer
 Charles Darwin - English biologist
 Elvis Presley - American singer
 Pablo Picasso -  Spanish painter
 Mother Teresa - Albanian saint
 Baron Rothschild - British baron
 Dr. Seuss - American children's writer and illustrator
 Mark Twain - American author
 Shoshana Damari - Israeli singer
 Enid Blyton - English author
 Erich Kästner - German children's writer
 Hanna Rovina - Israeli actress
 Abraham Lincoln - former American president
 Maimonides - Jewish philosopher

Third season 

 Rabbi Akiva - Jewish rabbi
 Eliezer Ben-Yehuda - Hebrew lexicographer, father of modern Hebrew
 Harry Houdini - American illusionist
 Pythagoras - Greek philosopher
 Groucho Marx - American comedian
 Winston Churchill - Former prime-minister of the United Kingdom
 Diogenes - Greek philosopher
 Jonathan Swift - English satirist
 Sara Levi-Tanai - Israeli choreographer
 A. D. Gordon - Russian philosopher
 Mattathias - Jewish priest
 Socrates - Greek philosopher
 C. S. Lewis - British theologian
 Chaim Weizmann - First Israeli president
 Teddy Kollek - Former mayor of Jerusalem
 Arthur Rubinstein - Jewish pianist
 Naguib Mahfouz - Egyptian writer
 Abie Nathan - Israeli peace activist
 Dian Fossey - American zoologist
 Abba Eban - Israeli diplomat
 Yitzhak Ben-Zvi - Former Israeli president
 Orde Wingate - British General
 Kahlil Gibran - Lebanese poet
 Nachum Gutman - Israeli painter
 Alexander the Great - Macedonian conqueror
 Alexander Zaïd -  Jewish politician
 Shalom Shabazi - Yemeni rabbi
 Pinhas Rutenberg - Israeli engineer

Forth season 

 Moses - Lead figure in the Hebrew Bible
 Marshall McLuhan - Canadian philosopher
 Kaytek the Wizard - fictional character
 Cleopatra - Egyptian monarch
 Menachem Mendel of Kotzk - Polish rabbi
 Doctor Dolittle - Fictional character
 Don Quixote - Fictional character
 Poseidon - Greek god of the sea
 Franz Kafka - Bohemian author
 Pocahontas - Native american
 Napoleon - French emperor
 John Lennon - English singer
 Miriam - Sister of Moses
 Henrik Ibsen - Norwegian playwright
 Hershel - Jewish jester
 Ya'akov Hodorov - Israeli footballer
 Gerald Durrell - British zookeeper and author
 Andy Warhol - American artist
 Narcissus - Greek hunter
 Coco Chanel - French designer
 Jim Henson - American puppeteer
 Ralph Klein - Israeli basketball player
 Anwar Sadat - Former Egyptian president
 Zhuang Zhou - Chinese philosopher
 Eugène Ionesco - Playwright
 Edward A. Murphy Jr. - American engineer
 Hippocrates - Greek physician
 Calliope - Muse of poetry
 Mustafa Kemal Atatürk - Founding father of  Turkey
 Isaac Asimov - American writer

Fifth season 

 Shaike Ophir - Israeli comedian
 David Livingstone - Scottish explorer
 Sun Tzu - Chinese general
 Marco Polo - Italian explorer
 Jethro - Biblical figure
 Farid al-Atrash - Egyptian musician
 Yigael Yadin - Israeli politician
 Patanjali - Indian scholar
 Antoni Gaudí - Spanish architect
 Walter Gropius - German architect
 Solon - Greek statesman
 Oscar Niemeyer - Brazilian architect
 Eleanor - French duchess
 Peter Pan - Fictional character
 Sigmund Freud - Austrian psychiatrist
 Struwwelpeter - German children's book character
 Johan Huizinga - Dutch historian
 Ayin Hillel - Israeli poet
 Christina - Former queen of Sweden
 Nahshon - Biblical figure
 Shalom Aleichem - Jewish poet
 Keith Haring - American artist
 Baron Munchausen - fictional German nobleman
 Sasha Argov - Israeli composer
 Neil Armstrong - American astronaut, first man to walk on the moon
 Ephraim Kishon - Israeli author
 Abraham Goldfaden - Yiddish playwright
 Sappho - Greek poet

Sixth season 

 Menachem Begin - Former Israeli prime-minister
 Fadwa Tuqan - Palestinian poet
 Wassily Kandinsky - Russian painter
 James Naismith - Canadian physician, Inventor of basketball
 Kurt Weill - German composer
 Bertolt Brecht - German playwright
 Danny Kaye - American actor
 Clara Barton - American nurse, founder of the American Red Cross
 Igor Stravinsky - Russian composer
 Ian Fleming - English author
 Rita Levi-Montalcini - Italian neurologist
 Marie Curie - Polish chemist
 Nathan Alterman - Israeli poet
 L. L. Zamenhof - Polish linguist, inventor of Esperanto language
 Ibn Battuta - Berber explorer
 Gregor Mendel - Silesian scientist
 Federico Fellini - Italian film-maker
 Ibn Gabirol - Jewish philosopher
 Joseph Lister - British surgeon
 Judah Halevi - Jewish philosopher
 Édith Piaf - French singer
 Meir Dizengoff - Jewish politician
 Invention of the wheel - The only episode not about a personality
 Jules Verne - French author
 L. Frank Baum - Children's writer
 Louis Pasteur - French chemist
 Yitzhak Navon - Former president of Israel
 Marc Chagall - Jewish artist
 Aristophanes - Greek playwright
 Susan B. Anthony - American women's rights activist
 Alan Turing - English mathematician
 Louis Armstrong - American musician
 Maya Angelou - American poet

External links 
 Shraga Bishgada full episodes, on the Kan Educational website 
 Shraga Bishgada on Ishim 

Israeli Educational Television
Israeli children's television series
2013 Israeli television series debuts